2065 Spicer, provisional designation , is a dark and eccentric asteroid from the middle region of the asteroid belt, approximately 17 kilometers in diameter.

The asteroid was discovered on 9 September 1959, by the Indiana Asteroid Program at Goethe Link Observatory near Brooklyn, Indiana, United States, and named after American anthropologist Edward H. Spicer.

Orbit and classification 

Spicer orbits the Sun in the central main-belt at a distance of 2.1–3.3 AU once every 4 years and 5 months (1,619 days). Its orbit has an eccentricity of 0.23 and an inclination of 6° with respect to the ecliptic.

Physical characteristics 

Spicers spectra is that of an X-type and Xc-type in SMASS classification scheme, which indicates a transitional stage to the carbonaceous C-type asteroid. It has also been characterized as a P-type asteroid by the NEOWISE mission.

Photometry 

In January 2005, photometric measurements of Spicer made by American astronomer Brian Warner at the Palmer Divide Observatory gave a lightcurve with a well-defined rotation period of  hours and a brightness variation of  magnitude.

Diameter and albedo 

According to the survey carried out by NASA's Wide-field Infrared Survey Explorer with its subsequent NEOWISE mission, Spicer measures 16.721 kilometers in diameter and its surface has an albedo of 0.062, while the Collaborative Asteroid Lightcurve Link assumes a standard albedo for carbonaceous asteroids of 0.057 and calculates a diameter of 18.43 kilometers with an absolute magnitude of 12.4.

Naming 

This minor planet was named after American anthropologist Edward H. Spicer (1906–1983), professor at the University of Arizona, and a former president of the American Anthropological Association.

In 1955, Spicer's negotiations with the local district and tribal councils were instrumental for receiving permission to evaluate the location where the Kitt Peak National Observatory was later built. The official naming citation was published by the Minor Planet Center on 26 May 1983.

Notes

References

External links 
  
 Asteroid Lightcurve Database (LCDB), query form (info )
 Dictionary of Minor Planet Names, Google books
 Discovery Circumstances: Numbered Minor Planets (1)-(5000) – Minor Planet Center
 
 

002065
002065
Named minor planets
002065
19590909